Platanthera carnosilabris is a species of flowering plant in the orchid family Orchidaceae, native to south-central China (north-west Yunnan).

Taxonomy
The species was first described by Tsin Tang and Fa Tsuan Wang in 1940, as Herminium carnosilabre. A molecular phylogenetic study in 2014 found that it was deeply embedded in a clade of Platanthera species, and so it was transferred to that genus as Platanthera carnosilabre.

References

carnosilabris
Orchids of Yunnan
Plants described in 1940